I/O may refer to:
Input/output, a system of communication for information processing systems
Input–output model, an economic model of flow prediction between sectors
Industrial and organizational psychology, the field of psychology that studies the workplace
Industrial organization, the field of economics that studies the behavior of firms
i/o (album), an upcoming album by Peter Gabriel
Input/Output (EP), a 2003 EP by The Letterpress
I/O (visual novel), a Japanese science fiction visual novel by Regista
I/O, a 2004 album by the Canadian rock band Limblifter
I/O model, a model of computation
Input/Output a contemporary Christian children's song on the 1984 Bill Gaither Trio LP entitled (Ten New Songs With Kids...For Kids About) Life

See also
IO (disambiguation)
Google I/O
Input and output (medicine)